St. James Episcopal Church is a historic Episcopal church at 112 Broadway in Fort Edward in Washington County, New York.  It was built in 1849 and modified in three stages in 1880, 1896, and 1914–1915.  It is a Gothic Revival style ecclesiastical structure and features a side bell tower on the northwest corner of the building.

It was listed on the National Register of Historic Places in 1998.

References

Churches completed in 1849
19th-century Episcopal church buildings
Episcopal church buildings in New York (state)
Churches on the National Register of Historic Places in New York (state)
Gothic Revival church buildings in New York (state)
Churches in Washington County, New York
1849 establishments in New York (state)
National Register of Historic Places in Washington County, New York